Vulcaniella is a genus of moths in the family Cosmopterigidae, containing the following species:

Vulcaniella anatolica Koster & Sinev, 2003
Vulcaniella caucasica Sinev, 1986
Vulcaniella cognatella Riedl, 1991
Vulcaniella extremella (Wocke, 1871)
Vulcaniella fiordalisa (Petry, 1904)
Vulcaniella gielisi Koster & Sinev, 2003
Vulcaniella glaseri Riedl, 1966
Vulcaniella grabowiella (Staudinger, 1859)
Vulcaniella grandiferella Sinev, 1986
Vulcaniella kabulensis J.C. Koster, 2008
Vulcaniella karadaghella Sinev, 1986
Vulcaniella klimeschi (Riedl, 1966)
Vulcaniella kopetdaghella Sinev, 1986
Vulcaniella peristrepta (Meyrick, 1917)
Vulcaniella pomposella (Zeller, 1839)
Vulcaniella pontica Koster & Sinev 2003
Vulcaniella rosmarinella (Walsingham, 1891)
Vulcaniella schultzendorffi (Amsel, 1958)
Vulcaniella vartianae (Amsel, 1968)

References
Natural History Museum Lepidoptera genus database
Vulcaniella at funet

 
Cosmopteriginae